The Big Flame is a 1969 BBC television play by socialist playwright Jim Allen, produced by Tony Garnett and directed by Ken Loach. The play tells the story of 10,000 dockworkers occupying the Liverpool docks in a "work-in". Filmed in a gritty, realistic drama documentary style, it was first broadcast on 19 February 1969 on BBC1, at a time when unemployment was rising in Britain. The play was shown in the BBC's The Wednesday Play anthology strand, which was noted for tackling social issues.

Following its broadcast, Mary Whitehouse, president of the National Viewers' and Listeners' Association, wrote to both Prime Minister Harold Wilson and Leader of the Opposition Edward Heath, demanding that they review the charter of the BBC in light of its transmission of "a blueprint for the communist takeover of the docks." Unofficial strikes were the subject of political debate at the time, and the government had proposed a ban on unofficial strikes the previous month in the paper In Place of Strife.

Last broadcast on 26 August 1971, the name of the play was later used by a revolutionary socialist organisation founded in Liverpool in 1970.

Jim Allen and Ken Loach, along with many of the same cast, also collaborated on the 1971 film The Rank and File.  The two films have been noted as being similar in many ways.

In September 2011, the play was released on DVD as part of the 6-disc box set, Ken Loach at the BBC.

Cast

See also
Upper Clyde Shipbuilders - a famous work-in at the shipyards on the River Clyde, Scotland, in 1971
1971 Harco work-in - a famous work-in by steelworkers in Campbelltown, New South Wales, Australia, in 1971
Workers' self-management

References

External links

 

1969 plays
1969 television films
1969 films
1969 television plays
BBC television dramas
British docudrama films
Films directed by Ken Loach
Films set in Liverpool
Black-and-white British television shows
Social realism
1960s British films
British drama television films